Article 13 of the Constitution of the Republic of Singapore, guarantees a prohibition against banishment and the right to freedom of movement.

Text of Article 13 
Article 13 of the Constitution of the Republic of Singapore guarantees to all persons a prohibition against banishment and the right to freedom of movement. It states:

Article 13. Prohibition of banishment and freedom of movement

(1)  No citizen of Singapore shall be banished or excluded from Singapore.

(2)  Subject to any law relating to the security of Singapore or any part thereof, public order, public health or the punishment of offenders, every citizen of Singapore has the right to move freely throughout Singapore and to reside in any part thereof.

Article 13(1) embodies the concept of the rule of law, an early expression of which was the 39th article of the Magna Carta of 1215: "No freeman shall be ... exiled ... except by the lawful judgment of his peers or by the law of the land."

Prohibition Against Banishment and Freedom of Movement

Meaning of Banishment 

The courts have not yet had the opportunity to define the term banishment in Article 13(1).

Meaning of Freedom of Movement 
Lo Pui Sang v. Mamata Kapildev Dave (2008) took a narrow approach to the reading of personal liberty in Article 9(1). The High Court of Singapore held that personal liberty only refers to freedom from unlawful incarceration or detention, and does not include a liberty to contract. Although it was suggested this had always been the understanding of the term, no authority was cited.

Meaning of Subject to any law 
Subject to any law relating to the security of Singapore or any part thereof, public order, public health or the punishment of offenders

Fundamental rules of natural justice 

In the Malaysian case Arumugam Pillai v. Government of Malaysia (1976), the Federal Court construed the phrase save in

Extent of natural justice 
In Ong Ah Chuan and the subsequent decision Haw Tua Tau v. Public Prosecutor (19

A procedural or substantive concept? 
Traditionally, at common law, natural justice is taken to be a procedural concept that embodies the twin pillars of audi alteram partem (hear the other party) and nemo iudex in causa sua (no one should be a judge in his or her own case.

Customary international law

Application

Prohibition Against Banishment

Prohibition Against Banishment  
This issue has yet to come before the Singapore courts.

Right to personal liberty

Rights of arrested persons 

Article 9(2) of the Constitution enshrines the right of persons who have been detained to apply to the High Court challenging the legality of their detention. The application is for an order for review of detention, which was formerly called a writ of habeas corpus. The Court is required to inquire into the complaint, and order the detainee to be produced before the Court and released unless it is satisfied that the detention is lawful.

Article 9(3) requires that an arrested person be informed "as soon as may be" of the grounds of his arrest. Article 9(4) goes on to provide that if the arrested person is not released he must, without unreasonable delay, and in any case within 48 hours (excluding the time of any necessary journey) be produced before a magistrate and cannot be further detained in custody without the authority of the magistrate. The person's attendance before the magistrate may be in person or by way of video-conferencing or other similar technology in accordance with law.

Right to counsel 
Article 9(3) also states that an arrested person must be allowed to consult and be defended by a legal practitioner of his choice.

Restrictions on the rights to life and personal liberty 
As mentioned above, Parliament is entitled to restrict the rights to life and personal liberty as long as it acts "in accordance with law". More specific restrictions on Article 9 include Article 9(5), which provides that Articles 9(3) and (4) of the Constitution do not apply to enemy aliens or to persons arrested for contempt of Parliament pursuant to a warrant issued by the Speaker.

Detention under the Criminal Law (Temporary Provisions) Act and the Misuse of Drugs Act 
Article 9(6) saves any law
 (a) in force before the commencement of the Constitution authorizing the arrest and detention of any person in the interests of public safety, peace and good order; or
 (b) relating to the misuse of drugs or intoxicating substances which authorizes the arrest and detention of any person for treatment and rehabilitation,
from being invalid because of inconsistency with Articles 9(3) and (4). This provision took effect on 10 March 1978 but was expressed to apply to laws in force prior to that date. Introduced by the Constitution (Amendment) Act 1978, the provision immunizes the Criminal Law (Temporary Provisions) Act and Part IV of the Misuse of Drugs Act from unconstitutionality.

Preventive detention is the use of executive power to detain individuals on the basis that they are predicted to commit future crimes that will threaten national interest. Among other things, the Criminal Law (Temporary Provisions) Act empowers the Minister for Home Affairs, if satisfied that a person has been associated with activities of a criminal nature, to order that he or she be detained for a period not exceeding 12 months if the Minister is of the view that the detention is necessary in the interests of public safety, peace and good order.

Under the Misuse of Drugs Act, the Director of the Central Narcotics Bureau may order drug addicts to undergo drug treatment or rehabilitation at an approved institution for renewable six-month periods up to a maximum of three years.

Detention under the Internal Security Act 
Section 8(1) of Singapore's Internal Security Act ("ISA") gives the Minister for Home Affairs the power to detain a person without trial for any period not exceeding two years on the precondition that the President is: "satisfied ... that ... it is necessary to do so ... with a view to preventing that person from acting in any manner prejudicial to the security of Singapore ... or to the maintenance of public order or essential services therein". The period of detention may be renewed by the President indefinitely for periods not exceeding two years at a time as long as the grounds for detention continue to exist.

The ISA has its constitutional basis in Article 149 of the Constitution, which sanctions preventive detention and allows for laws passed by the legislature against subversion to override the Articles protecting the personal liberties of the individual. Specifically, Article 149(1) declares such legislation to be valid notwithstanding any inconsistency with five of the fundamental liberty provisions in the Constitution, including Article 9. Thus, detentions under the ISA cannot be challenged on the basis of deprivation of these rights.

References

Notes

Cases 
 Ong Ah Chuan v. Public Prosecutor (1980) UKPC 32, [1981] A.C. 648, [1979–1980] S.L.R.(R.) [Singapore Law Reports (Reissue)] 710, Privy Council (on appeal from Singapore).
 Haw Tua Tau v. Public Prosecutor (1981) UKPC 23, [1982] A.C. 136, [1981–1982] S.L.R.(R.) 133, P.C. (on appeal from Singapore).
 Tan Tek Seng v. Suruhanjaya Perkhidmatan Pendidikan [1996] 1 M.L.J. [Malaya Law Journal] 261, Court of Appeal (Malaysia).
 Washington v. Glucksberg , Supreme Court (United States).
 Sugumar Balakrishnan v. Pengarah Imigresen Negeri Sabah [1998] 3 M.L.J. 289, C.A. (Malaysia).
 Nguyen Tuong Van v. Public Prosecutor (2004) SGCA 47, [2005] 1 S.L.R.(R.) 103, Court of Appeal (Singapore), archived from the original on 15 November 2010.
 Lee Kwan Woh v. Public Prosecutor [2009] 5 M.L.J. 301, Federal Court (Malaysia).
 Yong Vui Kong v. Public Prosecutor [2010] 3 S.L.R. [Singapore Law Reports] 489, C.A. (Singapore).

Legislation 
  ("CLTPA").
  ("ISA").
  ("MDA").
 .

Other works 
 .
 .

Further reading

Articles 
 .
 .
 .
 .
 .
 .

Books 
 
 
 
 

Freedom of movement
Singaporean constitutional law